The year 2014 was the 43rd year after the independence of Bangladesh. It was also the first year of the third term of the Government of Sheikh Hasina.

Incumbents

 President: Abdul Hamid
 Prime Minister: Sheikh Hasina
 Chief Justice: Md. Muzammel Hossain

Demography

Climate

Flood
Continuous rainfall in north and northeastern Bangladesh caused flash floods in low-lying and densely populated areas in August. By the beginning of September, the number of affected people increased to 2.8 million. Bogra, Kurigram, Jamalpur, Netrokona, Lalmonirhat, Gaibandha, Naogaon, Brahmanbaria, and Mymensingh were the affected districts.

Economy

Note: For the year 2014 average official exchange rate for BDT was 77.64 per US$.

Events
 5 January - General election in Bangladesh goes on per schedule in spite of boycott from the major opposition parties. The incumbent Bangladesh Awami League won the election with a safe majority, winning 234 seats.
 9 February - The owners of Tazreen Fashions, Delwar Hossain and his wife Mahmuda Akter, hand themselves in to face charges of murder in relation to the death of 112 workers in a factory fire in Dhaka in November 2012.
 15 May - A ferry sinks on the Meghna River in Munshiganj District resulting in at least 12 deaths and hundreds missing.
 16 May - The ferry that sank on the Meghna River's death toll increased to 25.
 17 May - Officials call off rescue operations as 54 dead bodies recovered with an unknown number of people missing in a ferry disaster in the Meghna River.
 8 July - The United Nations Permanent Court of Arbitration rules in favour of Bangladesh in a border dispute with India over the Bay of Bengal.
 4 August - A ferry carrying about 200 passengers capsizes on the Padma River in Munshiganj District.
 5 August - Rescuers struggle to locate a sunken ferry in the Padma River leaving at least two people dead and many more missing.
 27 August - Popular Islamic preacher and TV personality Nurul Islam Farooqi killed by unknown assailants in 2014.
 20 October - A collision between two buses on the Dhaka-Rajshahi highway leaves at least 30 people dead.

Awards and Recognitions

Independence Day Award

Ekushey Padak

 Badrul Alam, Language Movement (posthumous)
 Biprodas Barua, language and literature
 Belal Chowdhury, language and literature
 Jamil Chowdhury, language and literature
 Samarjit Roy Chowdhury, arts 
 Ramkanai Das, arts 
 Rashid Haider, language and literature
 Shamsul Huda, Language Movement
 Enamul Huq, research
 Keramat Moula, arts
 Mujibur Rahman, social service
 Golam Sarwar, journalism
 Anupam Sen, education
 Abdus Shakur, language and literature (posthumous)
 SM Solaiman, arts (posthumous)

Sports
 Asian Games:
 Bangladesh participated in the 2014 Asian Games in Incheon, South Korea from 19 September to 4 October. A total of 137 athletes from Bangladesh participated in 14 sports. Bangladesh won 3 medals - all in team events. The women's cricket team won silver while men's cricket and kabaddi team won bronze medals.
 Commonwealth Games:
 Bangladesh participated at the 2014 Commonwealth Games in Glasgow, Scotland. Abdullah Baki won silver medal in Men's Shooting (10 metre air rifle) event.
 Domestic football:
 Sheikh Jamal Dhanmondi Club won Premier League title while Abahani Dhaka became runner-up.
 Cricket:
 Sri Lanka toured Bangladesh in January and February 2014 playing two Test Matches, three One Day Internationals and two Twenty20 Internationals. Sri Lanka won every match, with the exception of the second Test match which ended in a draw.
 Bangladesh hosted the Asia Cup for the second consecutive time from 24 February to 7 March 2014. The tournament featured Afghanistan, Bangladesh, India, Pakistan and Sri Lanka.
 Bangladesh hosted the men's and women's World Twenty20 from 15 March to 7 April 2014 in Dhaka, Chittagong and Sylhet.
 The Indian national cricket team toured Bangladesh from 15 to 19 June 2014 to play a three-match One Day International (ODI) series against the Bangladesh national cricket team. India won the One Day International series 2–0, with one match being abandoned.
 The Bangladesh national cricket team toured the West Indies from August to September 2014 for a tour consisting of two Test matches, three Limited Overs International (LOI) matches and one Twenty20 International. Bangladesh did not win any match on the tour.
 Zimbabwe toured Bangladesh from 26 October to 1 December 2014, playing three Test matches and five One Day International matches. Bangladesh won the Test series 3–0 and the ODI series 5–0.
 Field Hockey:
 Bangladesh hosted the fourth edition of the Men's Junior AHF Cup - the qualification tournament for the men's Hockey Junior Asia Cup organized by the Asian Hockey Federation at Maulana Bhasani Hockey Stadium in Dhaka from 30 November to 7 December 2014. Bangladesh won the tournament for the first time and qualified together with Oman for the 2015 Junior Asia Cup.

Deaths

 11 January - Muhammad Habibur Rahman, former Chief Justice and Chief Adviser of the 1996 caretaker government (b. 1928)
 9 February - Fazal Shahabuddin, poet (b. 1926)
 10 February - Rangalal Sen, national professor (b. 1933)
 9 April - A. B. M. Musa, journalist (b. 1931)
 10 June - Abdul Karim Shah, folk singer (b. 1927)
 15 June - Fazlul Karim, academician (b. 1925)
 29 June - Abul Hussain, poet (b. 1922)
 31 August - Abdul Alim, politician and convicted war criminal (b. 1930)
 5 September - Ramkanai Das, folk singer (b. 1935)
 9 September - Firoza Begum, singer (b. 1930)
 3 October - Kazi Morshed, film director (b. 1950)
 23 October - Ghulam Azam, Islamist politician and convicted war criminal (b. 1922)
 10 November - Syed Mainul Hossain, architect (b. 1952)
 11 November - Zillur Rahman Siddiqui, author and educationist (b. 1928)
 30 November - Qayyum Chowdhury, painter (b. 1932)
 7 December - Khalil Ullah Khan, actor (b. 1934)
 20 December - Maqsudul Alam, scientist (b. 1954)

See also
 2010s in Bangladesh
 List of Bangladeshi films of 2014
 2013–14 Bangladeshi cricket season
 2014–15 Bangladeshi cricket season
 Timeline of Bangladeshi history

References

 
2010s in Bangladesh
Years of the 21st century in Bangladesh
Bangladesh
Bangladesh